Yoncalı is a village in the Ovacık District, Tunceli Province, Turkey. The village is populated by Kurds of the Laçin tribe and had a population of 55 in 2021.

References 

Kurdish settlements in Tunceli Province
Villages in Ovacık District